Middleport Township is one of twenty-six townships in Iroquois County, Illinois, USA.  As of the 2010 census, its population was 4,375 and it contained 2,099 housing units.  Middleport Township changed its name to Watseka Township in September 1863, but then changed back to Middleport Township on an unknown date.

Geography

Cities, towns, villages
 Watseka (the county seat) (north half)

Unincorporated towns
 Pittwood at

Cemeteries
The township contains these five cemeteries: Chamberlain, Gard Army of the Republic, Lyman, Oak Hill and Roberts.

Major highways
  U.S. Route 24
  Illinois Route 1

Airports and landing strips
 Songwood Inn Airport

Landmarks
 Forest Park
 Kay Park
 Peters Park
 Shagbark Airport

Demographics

School districts
 Donovan Community Unit School District 3
 Iroquois County Community Unit School District 9

Political districts
 Illinois' 15th congressional district
 State House District 105
 State Senate District 53

References
 
 United States Census Bureau 2007 TIGER/Line Shapefiles
 United States National Atlas

External links
 City-Data.com
 Illinois State Archives

Townships in Iroquois County, Illinois
Townships in Illinois